COGS, used as an acronym, may refer to:
 Cost of goods sold, an accountancy metric
 City of Greater Shepparton
 Community of Genoa Schools sports teams, see Genoa, Illinois#Schools
 The University of Birmingham's School of Computer Science departmental society
 The University of Sussex School of Cognitive and Computing Sciences
 The Centre of Geographic Sciences at the Nova Scotia Community College

Cogs may also refer to:
 Cog (ship)
 Cogs, parts of a gear system
 Cogs (video game), a puzzle game

See also 

 Cog (disambiguation)